Stephon Alexander is a theoretical physicist, cosmologist, musician and author.

Personal life and education
Alexander was born in Trinidad and moved to the United States when he was eight. He grew up in the Bronx, New York City and attended DeWitt Clinton High School where his physics teacher Daniel Kaplan inspired him to study physics.

Alexander is a scientist and a jazz saxophonist who ponders links, including sound, between small and big things in the universe that go beyond Einstein's curved space-time and big bang theory.

Einstein's field equation being his favorite equation, his publication The Jazz of Physics is an autobiographical reflection of his research and theories. Involved with cosmology as a professional physicist, he is also a jazz saxophonist and a student of the works of John Coltrane, among other musicians interested in cosmology. At DeWitt Clinton High School in 10th grade, Alexander's mentor was his physics teacher Daniel Kaplan, who was the reason behind diverting Alexander's mind towards physics when discussing velocity and friction. In 2006, Alexander was named as one of the eight National Geographic inquisitive experimenters and explorers.

Career 
After receiving his doctoral degree, Alexander was a research physicist at Imperial College, London, as well as at the Stanford Linear Accelerator Center, Stanford University. Alexander has held faculty positions at Penn State, Haverford College, and Dartmouth College before joining the faculty at Brown University. Alexander was the president of the National Society of Black Physicists. He is also the executive director of Science and Arts Engagement New York Inc. (SAENY).

Academic life
Alexander started his academic career as a postdoctoral researcher at Imperial College, London, (2000-2002) and later on went to be a postdoctoral researcher at Stanford University's SLAC and Institute for Theoretical Physics (2002-2005). In 2005, he became an assistant professor of physics at Penn State University. In 2008, he served at Haverford College as an associate professor of physics leading to his positions of Ernest Everett 1907 Associate Professor of Natural Sciences and associate professor of physics and astronomy at Dartmouth College.

Alexander also works as a professor at Brown University and has spent much of his career as a first generation advocate. He also advocates for historically under-represented groups in the sciences. He is a member of the editorial board of Universe.

Research 
In June 2012, Alexander co-authored a paper that reinterpreted Hořava–Lifshitz gravity. The paper, Hořava-Lifshitz theory as a fermionic aether in Ashtekar gravity described how the HL theory could be naturally occurring. The authors also theorized that HL gravity could be interpreted as a time-like current that fills space-time.

In December 2012, Alexander was the co-author of the paper "Gravitational origin of the weak interaction's chirality". Focusing on the Lorentz group, the authors studied the unification of the electroweak and gravitational interactions and the space-time connection. The authors theorized, in ways similar to Plebanski and Ashtekar, how those weak interactions on the right-handed chiral half in space-time connection could explain the weak interaction.

The theory devised by Alexander and his co-authors was broken down into two phases. The first is a parity symmetric phase, similar to the studies and workings of Speziale. The next phase depends on whether the parity is broken or not. Under the breaking, it shows a Dirac fermion expressing itself as a chiral neutrino.

Around the same time, Alexander co-authored another paper that focused on the study of electric time in quantum cosmology. The paper formulated and studied new possibilities of the quantum behavior of space-time.

Alexander has mainly worked to extend Einstein's general theory of relativity curved space-time, taking it to extremes in the connection between the smallest and largest entities in the universe. 

Alexander has worked as the director of Dartmouth College's EE Just STEM Scholars Program, volunteered for public speaking in inner city schools, taught mathematics in prisons and monitors activities relevant to his scholarship.

Media 
In February 2013, Alexander wrote in The New York Times about the need for black academics to set a positive trend for the next generation. In the article, he called upon a number of personal experiences from his own education and life.

Alexander has been interviewed or quoted in media sources such as the Tavis Smiley Show, Forbes Magazine, NPR, Brian Lehrer Show, Science Salon/Skeptic Society, Downbeat Magazine, and Mercury News.

Music 
His album with Rioux was Here Comes Now. Alexander and bassist Melvin Gibbs formed a group that they named God Particle. Alexander is also the author of The Jazz of Physics, a book that discusses the link between music and the structure of the universe.

On a Nova documentary, Alexander was featured discussing his life as a jazz saxophonist, while also working as a physicist during the day.

See also
Through the Wormhole#Season 3 (2012)

Publications
 2016 The Jazz of Physics: The Secret Link Between Music and the Structure of the Universe.
 2021 Fear of a Black Universe: An Outsider's Guide to the Future of Physics.

Awards
2006 National Geographic Emerging Explorers
2008 NSF Career Award.
2010 AAAS John Wesley Powell Memorial Award.
2013 APS E. BOUCHET AWARD.
2022 Fellow of the American Physical Society

References

External links
Official website

American cosmologists
American physicists
American writers about music
American jazz saxophonists
American male saxophonists
Brown University alumni
Haverford College alumni
American male jazz musicians
Brown University faculty
Fellows of the American Physical Society
African-American physicists